Pöytyä (also ) is a municipality of Finland located in the Southwest Finland region.

The municipality is unilingually Finnish.

The neighbouring municipality of Karinainen was merged into Pöytyä in the beginning of 2005. The neighbouring municipality of Yläne was merged into Pöytyä in the beginning of 2009.

Pöytyä's neighbouring municipalities are Aura, Eura, Lieto, Loimaa, Marttila, Mynämäki, Oripää and Säkylä.

Gallery

References

External links

Municipality of Pöytyä – Official website